Kung Ling-i (September 19, 1915 – August 22, 2008), born in Taigu County, Shanxi, was the eldest daughter of Kung Hsiang-hsi and Soong Ai-ling.

Life
In 1928, 13-year-old Kong Ling-i went to Nanjing Jinling Girls' High School to study, and lived in the official residence of her uncle Chiang Kai-shek. At the end of the civil war, she moved to New York with her parents.

In 1943, Kung Ling-i went to the United States in the name of studying abroad, and announced her marriage to Chen Jien in the United States. They eventually broke their engagement.

On August 22, 2008, Kong Ling-i died at the age of 93 at the Fifth Avenue apartment in Manhattan, New York, USA. On August 26, the funeral ceremony was held in Manhattan, New York, where she was buried in New York state.

External reference
 孔祥熙長女孔令儀憶宋氏三姐妹
 照顧姨媽宋美齡廿載

1915 births
2008 deaths
Republic of China (1912–1949) emigrants to the United States
Chiang Kai-shek family